Ixhuatlán de Madero is a Municipality in Veracruz, Mexico. It is located in north zone of the State of Veracruz, about 376 km from state capital Xalapa, in the region called Huasteca Baja. It is one of 212 municipalities in Veracruz. It has an area of 598.81 km2.

The municipality of  Ixhuatlán de Madero  is bordered on the north by Chicontepec de Tejeda, on the east by Temapache, on the south by Hidalgo State and Puebla State, and on the west by Tlachichilco and Benito Juárez.

Its principal agricultural products are maize, beans, watermelon, green chile, coffee and orange fruit.

The town's main celebrations occur in May (5-15) to note the Batalla de Puebla, and in July to honor to San Cristobal, the town's Patron Saint.

The area's climate is warm and rainy, with more rain in summer and autumn.

References

External links
  Municipal Official webpage

Municipalities of Veracruz